The 2010–11 William & Mary Tribe men's basketball team represented The College of William & Mary during the 2010–11 college basketball season. This was head coach Tony Shaver's eighth season at William & Mary. The Tribe competed in the Colonial Athletic Association and played their home games at Kaplan Arena. They finished the season 10–22, 4–14 in CAA play and lost in the quarterfinal round of the 2011 CAA men's basketball tournament to Hofstra. They did not participate in any post-season tournaments.

References

William and Mary Tribe
William & Mary Tribe men's basketball seasons
William and Mary Tribe
William and Mary Tribe